Aysi Kola (also Romanized as Aysī Kolā; also known as Asbī Kolā and Asī Kolā) is a village in Pazevar Rural District, Rudbast District, Babolsar County, Mazandaran Province, Iran. At the 2006 census, its population was 667, in 175 families.

References 

Populated places in Babolsar County